Paul Bryce (born 12 July 1968) is a former Australian rules footballer who played with North Melbourne, Melbourne and the Sydney Swans in the Victorian/Australian Football League (VFL/AFL).

Bryce was a defender but was also used in the ruck and up forward. After making his debut as an 18-year-old in 1987, Bryce played regular games over the next three seasons.

A former Wangaratta Rovers player, he was traded to Melbourne for John Ahern before the 1991 season and took part in his first final that year.

He found himself at his third club in 1993 when Sydney selected him with the third pick of the pre-season draft and despite playing 17 games that season he was delisted at the end of the year.

Later in the decade, Bryce captained and coached Launceston in the Northern Tasmanian Football League.

References

External links
 DemonWiki profile
 

1968 births
North Melbourne Football Club players
Melbourne Football Club players
Sydney Swans players
Wangaratta Rovers Football Club players
Launceston Football Club players
Launceston Football Club coaches
Australian rules footballers from Victoria (Australia)
Living people